The Muhajir Province Movement is a Muhajir nationalist political movement to create the separate province in Karachi, Sindh which seeks to represent the Muhajir people of  Pakistan. Muhajir province consisting of Muhajir-majority areas of Sindh which would be independent from Sindh government.

History
In 1954, the Muhajir Politician Mahmud-ul-Haq Usmani proposed the Muhajir Province and  demanded Karachi as an separate province for Muhajirs. This idea was later revived by Muhajir nationalist Politician Altaf Hussain the founder and leader of Muttahida Qaumi Movement (MQM) which is currently active as an Muttahida Qaumi Movement – London (MQM-L).

Ethnic violence 
Since 1954 the tensions raised between the Sindhis and Muhajirs over province  as both are the main ethnic groups of karachi, the Sindhi nationalists strongly opposed the Muhajir Province movement and in 1988 thousands of Muhajirs killed in Hyderabad, Sindh by Sindhi nationalists for demanding separate province in Sindh. Altaf Hussain blamed Pakistani establishment and Pakistan's main intelligence agency for orchestrating the massacre he believed that the Sindhi nationalists are sponsored by establishment to suppressed the muhajir province movement, however the government denied the allegations of Altaf and condemned the massacre.

Mystery Movement (2012) 
In 2012 there was an unexplained, albeit mysterious, political development in Karachi, and partly in Hyderabad, where a hitherto unknown organisation has started a campaign for the creation of a separate province. It began with some wall chalking (graffiti) on the main thoroughfares for a ‘muhajir suba’.

Operation against MQM for promoting violence for province 
On 11 March 2015, Pakistan Rangers carried out a raid at Nine Zero, the headquarters of MQM in Nine Zero, Karachi as well as the party’s public secretariat, Khursheed Begum Memorial Hall, and arrested over 100+ activists of MQM. In August 2016, after the Altaf Hussain's 22 August hate speech against Pakistan leds riots and unrest the Government of Pakistan declared MQM as an proscribed party and military launched crack down on the party leadership and party headquarters in Nine Zero, Karachi was sealed by military and Pakistan Rangers the party's leaders including Farooq Sattar were arrested and disappeared by Pakistan Rangers and intelligence agencies, and most elected parliamentarians in the MQM were forced to disassociate themselves from Altaf Hussain. MQM-L terminated the Farooq Sattar's party membership for party rules violations,which resulted in him forming his own separate "establishment-sponsored" party faction Muttahida Qaumi Movement-Pakistan (MQM-P) after release from custody by the Pakistan Rangers. MQM-P also supports the idea of Muhajir Province through peaceful and democratic struggle opposing violence.

Post-split support 
In 2022, Muhajir Qaumi Movement (MQM-H) chairman Afaq Ahmed Khan has said that a movement for ‘South Sindh’ province is the only solution to the issues being faced by the Muhajir community.

Demographics

Language 

The major language spoken in the Urban Sindh is Urdu and mostly spoken in most parts of Urban Sindh.

References 

Politics of Sindh
Political movements in Pakistan
Muhajir politics
Muttahida Qaumi Movement